Norman David Malmuth (January 22, 1931 – July 3, 2007) was an American aeronautical engineer.

Malmuth was a native of Brooklyn, born on January 22, 1931. He was one of four children born to parents Jacob and Selma Malmuth. He had one sister, Gail, and two brothers, Bruce and Daniel. Norman Malmuth left New York to study aeronautical engineering at the University of Cincinnati, where he earned his bachelor's degree in 1953. After completing his undergraduate study, Malmuth worked for Grumman Aircraft for three years. He continued studying aeronautical engineering, and earned a master's degree in the subject in 1956, from the Polytechnic Institute of Brooklyn. Upon earning his master's degree, Malmuth began working for Rockwell International. Malmuth concurrently pursued doctoral study in the same field at the California Institute of Technology, where he was advised by Julian Cole and graduated in 1962. Malmuth lived in the Conejo Valley for three decades, and while affiliated with the Rockwell Science Center, was elected a fellow of the American Physical Society in 1999, "[f]or his fundamental contributions in nonlinear gasdynamics involving application of combined asymptotic and numerical methods to the understanding of transonic, hypersonic and plasma aerodynamics as well as industrial flows." Malmuth was also a fellow of the American Institute of Aeronautics and Astronautics, and the 1991 recipient of its Aerodynamics Award. He died on July 3, 2007, in Newbury Park, California.

References

People from Newbury Park, California
Fellows of the American Physical Society
2007 deaths
Polytechnic Institute of New York University alumni
1931 births
Engineers from California
20th-century American engineers
California Institute of Technology alumni
American aerospace engineers
Engineers from New York City
Scientists from Brooklyn
Fellows of the American Institute of Aeronautics and Astronautics
University of Cincinnati alumni